In agriculture, a harrow is a farm implement used for surface tillage. It is used after ploughing  for breaking up and smoothing out the surface of the soil. The purpose of harrowing is to break up clods and to provide a soil structure, called tilth, that is suitable for planting seeds. Coarser harrowing may also be used to remove weeds and to cover seed after sowing. 

Harrows differ from ploughs, which cut the upper 12 to 25 centimetre (5 to 10 in) layer of soil, and leave furrows, parallel trenches. Harrows differ from cultivators in that they disturb the whole surface of the soil, while a cultivator instead disturbs only narrow tracks between the crop rows to kill weeds.

There are four general types of harrows: disc harrows, tine harrows (including spring-tooth harrows, drag harrows, and spike harrows), chain harrows, and chain-disk harrows. Harrows were originally drawn by draft animals, such as horses, mules, or oxen, or in some times and places by manual labourers. In modern practice they are almost always tractor-mounted implements, either trailed after the tractor by a drawbar or mounted on the three-point hitch.

A modern development of the traditional harrow is the rotary power harrow, often just called a power harrow.

Harrow action
In modern mechanized farming, generally a farmer will use two harrows, one after the other. The disk harrow is used first to slice up the large clods left by the mould-board plough, followed by the spring-tooth harrow. To save time and fuel they may be pulled by one tractor; the disk hitched to the tractor, and the spring-tooth hitched to, and directly behind, the disk. The result is a smooth field with powdery dirt at the surface.

Types
In cooler climates the most common types are the disc harrow, the chain harrow, the tine harrow or spike harrow and the spring tine harrow. Chain harrows are often used for lighter work such as levelling the tilth or covering seed, while disc harrows are typically used for heavy work, such as following ploughing to break up the sod. In addition, there are various types of power harrow, in which the cultivators are power-driven from the tractor rather than depending on its forward motion.

Tine harrows are used to refine seed-bed condition before planting, to remove small weeds in growing crops and to loosen the inter-row soils to allow for water to soak into the subsoil. The fourth is a chain disk harrow. Disk attached to chains are pulled at an angle over the ground. These harrows move rapidly across the surface. A smooth seedbed is prepared for planting with one pass.

Chain harrowing can be used on pasture land to spread out dung, and to break up dead material (thatch) in the sward, and similarly in sports-ground maintenance a light chain harrowing is often used to level off the ground after heavy use, to remove and smooth out boot marks and indentations.  Used on tilled land in combination with the other two types, chain harrowing rolls remaining larger soil clumps to the surface where weather breaks them down and prevents interference with seed germination.

All four harrow types can be used in one pass to prepare soil for seeding.  It is also common to use any combination of two harrows for a variety of tilling processes. Where harrowing provides a very fine tilth, or the soil is very light so that it might easily be wind-blown, a roller is often added as the last of the set.

Harrows may be of several types and weights, depending on their purpose. They almost always consist of a rigid frame that holds discs, teeth, linked chains, or other means of moving soil—but tine and chain harrows are often only supported by a rigid towing-bar at the front of the set.

In the southern hemisphere, so-called giant discs are a specialised kind of disc harrows that can stand in for a plough in rough country where a mouldboard plough cannot handle tree-stumps and rocks, and a disc-plough is too slow (because of its limited number of discs). Giant scalloped-edged discs operate in a set, or frame, that is often weighted with concrete or steel blocks to improve penetration of the cutting edges. This sort of cultivation is usually followed by broadcast fertilisation and seeding, rather than drilled or row seeding.

A drag is a heavy harrow.

Power harrow
A rotary power harrow, or simply power harrow, has multiple sets of vertical tines. Each set of tines is rotated on a vertical axis and tills the soil horizontally. The result is that, unlike a rotary tiller, soil layers are not turned over or inverted, which is useful in preventing dormant weed seeds from being brought to the surface, and there is no horizontal slicing of the subsurface soil that can lead to hardpan formation.

Historical reference

In Europe, harrows were used in antiquity and the Middle Ages. The oldest known illustration of a harrow is in Scene 10 of the eleventh-century Bayeux Tapestry. An Arabic reference to harrows is to be found in Abu Bakr Ibn Wahshiyya's Nabatean Agriculture (Kitab al-Filaha al-Nabatiyya), of the 10th century, but claiming knowledge from Babylonian sources.

See also 

 List of agricultural machinery
 Roller (agricultural tool)
 Harrower (surname)

References

External links 

Harrows from the 11th-16th centuries 
"Little Harrows" Song parody

Agricultural machinery
Chinese inventions